Big Fury was a compact steel roller coaster at Six Flags Great Adventure, that operated from 1974 to 1977. It was a Pinfari Zyklon model Z64.

When Six Flags purchased the park in 1977, it was decided that a more exciting portable coaster would be an improvement. Big Fury was removed and sold to an unknown buyer and replaced by a Schwarzkopf Wildcat (54 m) called Wild Rider. Although Wild Rider had larger drops than a Zyklon and the two were painted different colors, this roller coaster is often confused with the Wildcat roller coaster that replaced it.

References

Former roller coasters in New Jersey
Roller coasters operated by Six Flags
Roller coasters manufactured by Pinfari
Six Flags Great Adventure